Tomáš Skuhravý (born 7 September 1965) is a Czech former footballer who played as a striker. He is famous for scoring 5 headed goals for Czechoslovakia in 1990 World Cup.

Club career
At club level, Skuhravý mostly played in the Italian Serie A in the early 1990s with Genoa, being signed from Sparta Prague, forming a prolific partnership with Uruguayan Carlos Aguilera. Tall and powerful Skuhravy usually attained full shape and proficiency later in the season while the smaller and quicker Aguilera gave his best in the early matches; together they managed to give Genoa a solid attack all-year round. In the 1990–91 season, the two players scored 15 goals apiece, good for tied-third in the scorers' standings, leading Genoa to a fourth place in the final standings, arguably the best result in the club's modern history. The following year he helped his team reach the semi-finals in the UEFA Cup, ultimately being eliminated by eventual champions Ajax Amsterdam. Skuhravý scored a total of 57 goals with Genoa, becoming the best club goalscorer in the Serie A for the rossoblu. He left Genoa in 1995 to join Sporting Clube de Portugal, where he ended his playing career.

International career
At international level, Skuhravý played for Czechoslovakia and later the Czech Republic, playing a total of 49 international matches, scoring 17 goals. For Czechoslovakia he played 43 matches and scored 14 goals, while for the Czech Republic he played six matches, scoring three goals. He was a participant in the 1990 FIFA World Cup, where he scored five goals to become the second highest scorer for the tournament. This included the opening goal against Team USA , and a hat-trick against Costa Rica, in which all goals were scored by headers, the first time in World Cup history.

Post-playing career
In September 2018, Skuhravy was announced to have made a return into football as the new club manager of Serie C club Cuneo. He left Cuneo in June 2019 following the club's exclusion from the Italian football leagues due to financial problems.

Personal life
After retirement, Skuhravý moved back to Liguria; he currently lives in Celle Ligure, where he works as a restaurant owner and football pundit for a local TV channel. His cousin Roman Skuhravý is a former football player and currently a football manager.

References

External links
 
 

1965 births
People from Kolín District
Living people
Czechoslovak footballers
Czech footballers
Czechoslovakia international footballers
Czech Republic international footballers
Dual internationalists (football)
Serie A players
Serie B players
Genoa C.F.C. players
Primeira Liga players
Sporting CP footballers
Czech expatriate footballers
Expatriate footballers in Italy
Expatriate footballers in Portugal
1990 FIFA World Cup players
AC Sparta Prague players
FK Hvězda Cheb players
FK Viktoria Žižkov players
Nightclub owners
Czechoslovak expatriate footballers
Czechoslovak expatriate sportspeople in Italy
Czech expatriate sportspeople in Italy
Czech expatriate sportspeople in Portugal
Association football forwards
Sportspeople from the Central Bohemian Region